The Romanian Air Force 95th Air Base Captain Alexandru Șerbănescu is an air force base adjacent to George Enescu International Airport, Romania, south of Bacău, Bacău County.

The base was founded on 25 August 1995, having as purpose the support of the 96th Fighter Group training. From 1 May 2001 until 1 July 2004, during the military reorganization process, the Supersonic Training Center operated in the Bacău air base, preserving the tradition of training the young pilots according to the MIG-21 LanceR program. 

Since 1 July 2004, the 95th Air Base has undergone a thorough reorganization.

The base is currently the home of the 951st fighter squadron, operating MiG-21 LanceR and of the 952nd helicopter squadron, operating IAR-330L. The base is also home to the 205th Training Squadron (operating MiG-21 LanceR B).

Gallery

External links
  95th Air Base on the Romanian Air Force official website
  Order of Battle of the RoAF

95
Buildings and structures in Bacău County
1995 establishments in Romania